Shimenolepis granifera is an extinct yunnanolepid placoderm from the Late Llandovery of Li County, Hunan, China. It was the first described Silurian placoderm, and is the earliest known placoderm, known from distinctively ordered plates.

Description

Plates
Shimenolepis plates are very similar to the early Devonian yunnanolepid Zhanjilepis, also known from distinctively ornamented plates.

References

Placoderms of Asia
Prehistoric animals of China
Antiarchi
Silurian fish of Asia